Glenn Slater (born January 28, 1968) is an American lyricist for musical theatre. He has collaborated with Alan Menken, Christopher Lennertz, Andrew Lloyd Webber, among other composers. He was nominated for three Tony Awards for Best Original Score for the Broadway version of The Little Mermaid at the 62nd Tony Awards in 2008, Sister Act at the  65th Tony Awards in 2011, and School of Rock at the 70th Tony Awards in 2016.

Early life
Slater was born in Brooklyn, New York. He is Jewish. Raised in East Brunswick, New Jersey, he graduated from East Brunswick High School as part of the class of 1986; he became interested in drama while at high school after an unsuccessful effort as a songwriter with a band. In 1990, he graduated from Harvard University where he composed Hasty Pudding Theatricals' 141st production, Whiskey Business. He has received the ASCAP Foundation's Richard Rodgers New Horizon Award with composer Stephen Weiner.

Career
Slater wrote the lyrics for the Off-Broadway stage revue Newyorkers produced by the Manhattan Theatre Club in 2001.  He has written lyrics for six editions of Ringling Brothers & Barnum and Bailey Circus.

His first work with Alan Menken was writing the lyrics for the film Home on the Range in 2004 and the stage production Sister Act the Musical (2006).

He wrote the lyrics for the stage adaptation of Disney's The Little Mermaid (2008), replacing the animated film's original lyricist Howard Ashman, who died in 1991. He also worked with Menken on the new musical version of Leap of Faith.

Slater and his wife, Wendy Leigh Wilf, wrote the book, music and lyrics to a new musical Beatsville that received a production at the 2008 NAMT Festival of New Musicals, in New York.  It is based on the 1959 Roger Corman film A Bucket of Blood.

He has also composed the lyrics and co-wrote the book for the major Andrew Lloyd Webber musical Love Never Dies, which is a sequel to Lloyd Webber's 1986 musical The Phantom of the Opera. The show premiered in the West End in March 2010.

Adding to his career as a lyricist, Slater wrote the lyrics for the songs in Disney's 50th animated feature Tangled. In 2015 he worked again with Andrew Lloyd Webber for the Broadway musical School of Rock and continued his working relationship with Alan Menken writing lyrics for the songs of Galavant on ABC.

Slater attended the BMI Musical Theatre Workshop and was a resident writer with Musical Theatreworks.

Awards and honors
Slater has received the Kleban Award for Lyrics, the ASCAP Foundation Richard Rodgers New Horizons Award and the Jonathan Larson Award.

He was nominated for the 2008 Tony Award for Best Original Score for The Little Mermaid and received his second nomination for this award in 2011 for Sister Act.

He won a Grammy Award at the 2012 Grammy Awards (held on 12 February 2012), in the Best Song Written for Visual Media category for the song "I See The Light" from the animation movie Tangled. In July 2020, Slater won a Daytime Emmy Award for Original Song in a Children's, Young Adult or Animated Program for the song "Waiting in the Wings" from Rapunzel's Tangled Adventure.

Personal life
Slater lives in New York City with his wife, Wendy Leigh Wilf, and two sons, Benjamin and Daniel. He is a supporter of the Premier League club Tottenham Hotspur.

References

External links

 Internet Off-Broadway listing
Biography at americantheatrewing.org
Biography at sisteractthemusical.com

1968 births
American musical theatre lyricists
Broadway composers and lyricists
Jewish American songwriters
Living people
People from Brooklyn
East Brunswick High School alumni
People from East Brunswick, New Jersey
Walt Disney Animation Studios people
Daytime Emmy Award winners
Grammy Award winners
Songwriters from New Jersey
Songwriters from New York (state)
Hasty Pudding alumni
Animation composers